Pyke Glacier is a glacier 5 nautical miles (9 km) long, flowing southward from Detroit Plateau, between Albone and Polaris Glaciers on Nordenskjöld Coast in northern Graham Land, Antarctica. Mapped from surveys by Falkland Islands Dependencies Survey (FIDS) (1960–61). Named by United Kingdom Antarctic Place-Names Committee (UK-APC) for Geoffrey N. Pyke (1894–1948), English scientist who in 1941 originated the ideas developed by the Studebaker Corporation into the M-29 Tracked Cargo Carrier or "Weasel," the first really successful snow vehicle.

References
 SCAR Composite Antarctic Gazetteer.

Glaciers of Nordenskjöld Coast